Horia Demian Sports Hall, part of the city's Splaiul Independenţei sports complex, is a multi-use arena in Cluj-Napoca, Romania. It is used as the home ground of both the men's and women's handball and basketball teams of CS Universitatea Cluj-Napoca. It holds 2,525 seats.

The arena is named in honour of Horia Demian, a local basketball player. It hosted the 2006 MTV Romania Music Awards. It will be used as one of the two venues for the 2020 FIBA Under-17 Women's Basketball World Cup.

See also 
 BT Arena

References

Indoor arenas in Romania
Sports venues in Cluj-Napoca
Handball venues in Romania
Basketball venues in Romania
Music venues in Romania
Buildings and structures in Cluj-Napoca